Jone Romano (born Jone Borgheri; February 7, 1898 – August 1, 1979) was an Italian actress who appeared on stage and screen.

Biography
She appeared in the 1948 film adaptation of Les Misérables. Her career as an actress was relatively short.

Personal life
Romano was married to the actor Carlo Romano. Before her marriage to Romano, she was widowed to American World War I marine William James Ward. Together, they had a son, Aleardo, who became an actor. Romano was only 17 years old when she gave birth to Aleardo. She was also the grandmother to voice actors Luca, Andrea and Monica.

Filmography

References

Bibliography
 Delphine Gleizes. L'œuvre de Victor Hugo à l'écran: des rayons et des ombres. Presses Université Laval, 2005.

External links

1898 births
1979 deaths
Italian stage actresses
Italian film actresses
People from Pistoia